Draughton (pronounced Draftun) is a village and civil parish, population 240, in the Craven district of North Yorkshire, England.

On 5 July 2014, the Tour de France Stage 1 from Leeds to Harrogate passed through the village.

References

External links

 Draughton Parish Council

Villages in North Yorkshire
Civil parishes in North Yorkshire